Dangluo Township (Mandarin: 当洛乡) is a township in Maqên County, Golog Tibetan Autonomous Prefecture, Qinghai, China. In 2010, Dangluo Township had a total population of 3,890: 2,030 males and 1,860 females: 1,297 aged under 14, 2,379 aged between 15 and 65 and 214 aged over 65.

References 

Township-level divisions of Qinghai
Golog Tibetan Autonomous Prefecture